The 2012 Triglav Trophy was held on April 4–8, 2012. It was an international figure skating competition held annually in Jesenice, Slovenia. Skaters competed in the disciplines of men's and ladies' singles on the senior, junior, and novice levels.

Senior results

Men

Ladies

Junior results

Men

Ladies

Novice results

Boys

Girls

External links
 2012 Triglav Trophy results
 Official site

Triglav Trophy, 2012
Triglav Trophy